The Serie B 1951–52 was the twentieth tournament of this competition played in Italy since its creation.

Teams
Monza, Valdagno, Piombino and Stabia had been promoted from Serie C, while Roma and Genoa had been relegated from Serie A.

Events
A provisional fifth relegation was added to reduce the league.

FIGC’s President Ottorino Barassi imposed a playoff between the second club in B and the seventeenth in A to reduce the Serie A.

Final classification

Results

Serie A qualification play-off
Since it was decided to reduce the number of Serie A teams from 20 to 18 for the 1952-1953 season, only the top 16 teams in Serie A were guaranteed to remain there the following season, and only the first-placed team in Serie B was guaranteed a direct promotion to Serie A. The 18th team would be decided in a one-game playoff between the 17th-placed team in Serie A and the 2nd-placed team in Serie B.

The 3 last-placed teams in Serie A were guaranteed relegation. However, due to a tie for 17th place between Lucchese and Triestina, the teams had to play a two-legged tie-breaking series to determine which team would be relegated and which team qualified for the playoff.

Game played in Valdagno on July 13

Triestina maintained its place in Serie A.

References and sources
Almanacco Illustrato del Calcio - La Storia 1898-2004, Panini Edizioni, Modena, September 2005

Serie B seasons
2
Italy